Eddie Mannis (born April 14, 1959) is an American politician, who was elected to the Tennessee House of Representatives in 2020. He represented the 18th House District as a member of the Tennessee Republican Party.

Mannis, a businessman from Knoxville, previously ran for mayor of the city in the 2019 Knoxville mayoral election, winning the first round but losing the runoff to Indya Kincannon. His victory in the 2020 Republican state house primaries was initially challenged by candidate Gina Oster on the grounds that Mannis had voted in the 2020 Democratic Party presidential primaries, but was upheld after Mannis affirmed that he is a moderate Republican and voted crossover solely to prevent Bernie Sanders or Elizabeth Warren from becoming the Democratic nominee.

Alongside Torrey Harris, Mannis was of the first two openly LGBT state representatives elected in Tennessee.

References

Gay politicians
LGBT state legislators in Tennessee
Republican Party members of the Tennessee House of Representatives
Living people
Politicians from Knoxville, Tennessee
21st-century American politicians
1959 births